Back to the Future (also known as Back to the Future: The Animated Series) is an animated science-fiction comedy adventure television series for television based on the live-action Back to the Future film trilogy. The show lasted two seasons, each featuring 13 episodes, and ran on CBS from September 14, 1991 to December 26, 1992 with reruns until August 14, 1993. The network chose not to renew the show for a third season (citing low ratings). It was later rerun on Fox, as a part of the FoxBox block, from March 22 to August 30, 2003.

Although the series takes place after the films, creator Bob Gale has stated that the animated series and the comic books take place in their own 'what if' and alternate timelines. This show marked the debut television appearance of Bill Nye on a nationally broadcast show.

Premise 
Following the conclusion of Back to the Future Part III, in 1991, Dr. Emmett Brown moved into a farm in Hill Valley with his wife Clara, their sons Jules and Verne, and the family dog, Einstein. As with the films, time travel was achieved through the use of a modified DeLorean, which had apparently been rebuilt after it was destroyed at the end of the trilogy. The DeLorean now has voice-activated "time circuits" and can also travel instantaneously to different locations in space and time, in addition to folding into a suitcase. The characters also travel through time using the steam engine time machine Doc invented at the end of the third film.

Although Marty McFly is a main character and Jennifer Parker makes occasional appearances, the show focused primarily on the Brown family, whereas the films focused on the McFly family. The film's villain, Biff Tannen, also appeared frequently. In addition, relatives of the McFly, Brown, and Tannen families were plentiful in the past or future parallel time zones visited. Unlike the films, which took place entirely in Hill Valley and the surrounding area, the series frequently took the characters to exotic locations. At the end of every episode, Doc Brown would appear to do an experiment, often related to the episode's plot. The first season also included post-credits segments with Biff Tannen telling a joke related to the episode, alluding to Thomas F. Wilson's career as a stand-up comedian.

Characters 

 Marty McFly (voiced by David Kaufman) – The main character of the series. Marty spends a lot of time visiting the Brown house where Doc, Clara, and their sons live. He continues to travel through time alongside Jennifer, Doc and the rest of the Brown family on many of their misadventures. Marty and Jennifer become students at Hill Valley College after graduating from Hill Valley High School.
 Jennifer Parker (voiced by Cathy Cavadini) – Marty's girlfriend.
 Emmett "Doc" Brown (portrayed by Christopher Lloyd in live-action segments, voiced by Dan Castellaneta in the animated segments) – Marty's middle-aged best friend and the inventor of the DeLorean time machine, which he built out of a DeLorean sports car in 1985; he subsequently built a locomotive time machine from 1885 to 1895. In the first episode of the series, the DeLorean is apparently being rebuilt with added features, nodding to the events of Back to the Future Part III. He lives with Clara and two sons Jules and Verne.
 Einstein (vocal effects provided by Danny Mann in season 1, Hal Rayle in season 2) – The faithful sheep dog living with Doc, Clara, Jules, and Verne. He is also Marty's friend.
 Clara Clayton Brown (voiced by Mary Steenburgen) – Doc's wife, who, along with the rest of the family, moved to the 20th century. She and the Browns lived in a farmhouse outside Hill Valley in 1991. Clara's embracive nature has meant she's settled well into 20th-century life and became a teacher at Hill Valley Elementary. She occasionally joins her husband, sons, and Marty on their time travel road trips.
 Jules Brown (voiced by Josh Keaton) – Doc's eldest son; his middle name is revealed in the series as Eratosthenes. Jules is intelligent for his age and, similarly to his father, uses long words in his everyday vocabulary, insisting on calling Marty McFly by his full name "Martin". Jules is top of the class in his school due to his gifted knowledge; however, he is not very popular among the other kids due to their more collective trends and has but a few friends. He has a crush on his classmate Franny Philips and enjoys baseball and inventing, often helping his father crack down conclusions.
 Verne Brown (voiced by Troy Davidson) – Jules' younger brother. He is charming and adventurous but fairly vulnerable, not taking well to losing out or things he doesn't particularly enjoy doing. He is almost always seen wearing a raccoon skin cap which he clearly loves and inspired his regular insult, "skunkhead", which he often uses towards his more uptight brother. He also showed no qualm and in fact appeared to particularly enjoy himself wearing garb and open-toed sandals during the Roman Holiday adventure, which other boys from his modern time might have had gripes about, indicating he wouldn't have minded wearing such more often if he had the opportunity. Unlike Jules, Verne is quite popular at school and has many friends, including Marty McFly. Verne also developed a rivalry with Biff Tannen's son, Biff Jr.
 Biff Tannen (voiced by Thomas F. Wilson) – Biff is the great-grandson of Buford "Mad Dog" Tannen and is the present-day villain of the series, although most episodes feature his numerous ancestors or descendants instead. At one point, Marty once rhetorically questioned if there was a "Biff" in every time period and place they visited. During the first season, Biff would tell a joke after the end credits.
 Biff Tannen Jr. (voiced by Benji Gregory) - The son of Biff Tannnen.

Mary Steenburgen (Clara Clayton Brown) and Thomas F. Wilson (Biff Tannen) voiced their characters from the films. Christopher Lloyd played Doc Brown in the live-action segments which opened and closed each episode while Dan Castellaneta provided the animated Doc Brown's voice. James Tolkan, who previously portrayed Principal Strickland from the films, voiced an unnamed Civil Defense Warden in the episode "Marty Mcfly PFC". In addition, Bill Nye appeared as Dr. Brown's Lab Assistant during the live-action segments at the end of each episode performing scientific experiments related to the episode. Nye also serves as the show's technical advisor. These segments later led to Nye getting his own show.

Episodes

Series overview

Season 1 (1991)

Season 2 (1992)

Home media 
Although the show no longer airs on television, nine VHS cassettes and three laserdisc volumes of the series were released from 1993 to 1994, chronicling 18 of the 26 episodes. The complete show was released on DVD on October 20, 2015 for the first time, both individually and as part of the Back to the Future: The Complete Adventures collection (which also includes all three films of the trilogy). In addition, the first episode from each season of the animated series (Brothers and Mac the Black) are included as bonus materials in the Back to the Future: 30th Anniversary Trilogy set.

In 2016, Universal released an individual DVD of the show's first season in Region 1 on June 14 and the Season 2 on September 13.

Awards 
Daytime Emmy Awards
 1992 – Outstanding Film Sound Mixing – Jim Hodson, Bill Koepnick and Harry Andronis (won)
 1992 – Outstanding Film Sound Editing – Bill Koepnick, Russell Brower, Jim Hodson, Aaron L. King, Matt Thorne and Mark Keatts (won)
 1993 – Outstanding Film Sound Mixing – Ray Leonard and Paca Thomas (won)
 1993 – Outstanding Film Sound Editing – Paca Thomas, Ray Leonard, Marc S. Perlman and Melissa Ellis (won)

Comic books 
A comic book series was published by Harvey Comics detailing further adventures of the animated show. Two mini-series were published, the first being a four-issue run, the second, a three-issue run subtitled "Forward to the Future" and a "Special" issue was also released, reprinting parts of the first mini-series' first issue. The comics were written by Dwayne McDuffie with art by Nelson Dewey.

Toys 
In August 2020, as part of the 35th anniversary of the release of Back to the Future, three 6" scale action figures were produced by NECA based on Back to the Future: The Animated Series. Marty McFly, 'Doc' Brown and Einstein, and Biff Tannen were released as part of the "Toony Classics" line and sold both online and at retail at a $12.99 price point. Marty McFly came packed with a hoverboard and guitar with strap. Doc Brown included Einstein with his digital stopwatch collar, a remote control, a set of extra hands, and googles. The Biff Tannen figure included an alternate interchangeable head.

References

External links 
 Official Universal Pictures site advertising the trilogy
 BTTF.com
 Universal Pictures
 

Back to the Future (franchise) mass media
1990s American time travel television series
1991 American television series debuts
1992 American television series endings
1990s American animated television series
1990s American comic science fiction television series
1991 French television series debuts
1992 French television series endings
1990s French animated television series
American children's animated adventure television series
American children's animated comic science fiction television series
American time travel television series
American television series with live action and animation
Animated television shows based on films
CBS original programming
English-language television shows
French children's animated adventure television series
French children's animated comic science fiction television series
Television series by Amblin Entertainment
Television series by Universal Animation Studios
Television series by Universal Television
Television shows set in California
Universal Pictures cartoons and characters